Little Birds is a British drama television series starring Juno Temple and produced by Warp Films. Based on the homonymous work of erotica by Anaïs Nin, the six-episode series was released on Sky Atlantic and Now TV on 4 August 2020. In Australia, it is available on Stan.

Inspired by Anaïs Nin's posthumously published 1979 collection of erotic short stories of the same name, Little Birds weaves stories of love and desire together with personal drama and political intrigue, set against a uniquely distinctive backdrop of hedonism and conflict. The series was filmed in Andalucia with studio elements in Manchester.

The series made its US premiere on the Starz channel on 6 June 2021.

Premise
Little Birds is set in Tangier International Zone in 1955, one of the last outposts of colonial decadence, and a culture shock in more ways than one for American debutante Lucy Savage (Juno Temple). Lucy desires an unconventional life free from the societal cage she's been kept in and, along with Tangier itself, finds herself on the cusp of achieving a painful yet necessary independence.

Cast and characters

Main
 Juno Temple as Lucy Savage Cavendish-Smyth
 Yumna Marwan as Cherifa Lamour
 Hugh Skinner as Hugo Cavendish-Smyth
 Raphael Acloque as Adham Abaza
 Rossy de Palma as Contessa Mandrax
 Nina Sosanya as Lili von X
 Matt Lauria as Bill
 Kamel Labroudi as Leo
 Amy Landecker as Vanessa Savage
 Jean-Marc Barr as Secretary Pierre Vaney
 David Costabile as Grant Savage

Recurring
 Alexander Albrecht as Frederic

Guest
 Fady Elsayed as Aziz

Episodes

Production
In February 2019, it was announced Juno Temple, Yumna Marwan and Raphael Acloque had joined the cast of the series, with Stacie Passon directing from a screenplay by Sophia Al-Maria, Warp Films produced the series. The series aired on Sky Atlantic in the United Kingdom and Sky in Spain. In April 2019, Hugh Skinner, Jean-Marc Barr, Rossy de Palma and Nina Sosanya joined the cast of the series. In June 2019, Dave Constabile, Amy Landecker and Matt Lauria joined the cast of the series. Anne Nikitin composed the series score.

Filming
Principal photography began in March 2019. Production on the series took place in Tarifa, Spain and Manchester, England. Production concluded in June 2019.

References

External links
 

2020 British television series debuts
2020 British television series endings
2020s British drama television series
English-language television shows
Sky Atlantic original programming
Starz original programming
Television series based on short fiction
Television series set in 1955
Television shows filmed in the United Kingdom
Television shows filmed in Spain